Uschi Digard (born 15 August 1948) is a Swedish former softcore porn star and model mostly known for her roles in Russ Meyer films.

Early years 

When asked of her childhood, she has said, 

She had a convent education and learned various languages. She learned to ski and loved the outdoors life.  At school her left hand was tied behind her back and she was made to write with her right hand though she was naturally a lefthander.

Digard's breasts started developing at a young age, about which she commented, 

After leaving school she travelled to Italy and then France to improve her Italian and French. She then travelled to the Channel Islands and to London where she worked for a large hotel. Following this she travelled via Marrakesh to the Canary Islands where she worked during the winters for a jewellery firm on percentage payment. During summers she would travel around. She also worked in jewellery stores in Sweden and Switzerland. She met her husband in the Canary Islands.

Career 

Digard burst into cinema in Sweden where she starred in several softcore erotic films. In 1967, she went to the U.S. where she soon began appearing in numerous sexploitation movies such as Uschi's Hollywood Adventure (aka Raquel's Motel, 1970), a film so low-budget it was shot without sound and then dubbed with a narrative voiceover.

She also appeared in pornographic magazines. She was among the best known big bust models in the late 1960s and early 1970s. Magazines in which she appeared frequently include Knight, Cinema X, Latent Image, and Gent.

Digard was cast in Russ Meyer's Cherry, Harry & Raquel! (1970) to provide the dénouement in a final interpretive dance scene symbolizing the death of the antagonist. She went on to appear in more of Meyer's films in the 1970s: Supervixens (1975) and Beneath the Valley of the Ultra-Vixens (1979). She was also a co-producer on Up! and Beneath the Valley of the Ultra-Vixens. She provided the narration for Tundi Horvath's character in Meyer's last film Pandora Peaks (2000). She starred in Ed Wood’s The Only House In Town (1971). She appeared as Mayday in the cult action comedy Superchick (1973) starring Joyce Jillson, and starred with John Holmes in I Want You (1974). 

She had a minor role as a prisoner in the cult classic Ilsa, She Wolf of the SS (1975), appeared as 'Super Girl' in Fantasm (1976) directed by Richard Franklin, appeared as a girl at party in The Killer Elite (1975) directed by Sam Peckinpah and had a small role in Chesty Anderson, USN (1976). She also had a role as a character called 'Pussy' in Female Chauvinists (1976).

In 1977, Digard had a cameo appearance (naked in a shower) in the segment "Catholic High School Girls in Trouble" in John Landis's The Kentucky Fried Movie.

In 1979, she performed with John Holmes, Johnny Keyes, Serena, Candy Samples, Kitten Natividad, and Kelly Stewart in the pornographic film John Holmes and the All-Star Sex Queens from Zane Entertainment Group. In those years, she also starred in some "sexy wrestling" short-footage films, mainly for Triumph Studios and Ron Dvorkin's Bellstone.

She retired in 1982, and has not performed professionally since.

References

External links 
 

1948 births
Living people
Swedish people of Swiss descent
Swedish female adult models
Swedish pornographic film actresses
20th-century Swedish actresses